The 1999 Canadian Figure Skating Championships were held on January 26–31, 1999 in Ottawa, Ontario. They were the figure skating national championship which determines the national champions of Canada. The event was organized by Skate Canada, the nation's figure skating governing body. Skaters competed at the senior, junior, and novice levels in the disciplines of men's singles, ladies' singles, pair skating, and ice dancing. The results of this competition were used to pick the Canadian teams to the 1999 World Championships and the 1999 Four Continents Championships.

Senior results

Men

Ladies

Pairs

Ice dancing

Junior results

Men

Ladies

Pairs

Ice dancing

Novice results

Men

Ladies

Pairs

Ice dancing

External links
 1999 Bank of Montreal Canadian Championships

Canadian Figure Skating Championships
Figure skating
Canadian Figure Skating Championships
Sports competitions in Ottawa
1999 in Ontario
Canadian Figure Skating Championships
1990s in Ottawa